Varvarovka is a rural locality (a khutor) in Grishevskoye Rural Settlement, Podgorensky District, Voronezh Oblast, Russia. The population was 125 as of 2010. There are 3three streets.

Geography 
Saprino is the nearest rural locality.

References 

Rural localities in Podgorensky District